Aada Vandha Deivam is a 1960 Indian Tamil-language romantic dance film directed by P. Neelakantan and written by Era. Shanmugam. The film was an adaptation of the Tamil novel Ghaleer Ghaleer, written by LRV. It stars T. R. Mahalingam, M. R. Radha, Anjali Devi and E. V. Saroja. The film was released on 1 April 1960 and emerged a commercial success.

Plot 

"Mittadar" Anandan is a wealthy landowner and fan of fine arts including music, dancing, painting and sculpting. While on a nature study in the hills, he is injured in an accident caused by an explosion. He seeks refuge in a hut owned by Bhairavi, a street-smart dancer who lives alone to assert her independence. Unaware of his identity, she tends to his injuries and they both fall in love. After he recovers, Anandan returns home where he meets his dancer cousin Kalyani, who becomes attached to him. Her father, Singaram Pillai, becomes bankrupt and is to be arrested for not being able to pay his debts. As a result, he seeks refuge in the house of his sister, who is Anandan's widowed mother. Meanwhile, another of Anandan's uncles, Malaiyappan, lusts for Anandan's estate and Kalyani. She escapes from Malaiyappan and meets Bhairavi. The two women become friends, but after realising that Bhairavi is in love with Anandan, Kalyani voluntarily sacrifices her love. She agrees to marry Malaiyappan, but at the wedding ceremony consumes poison and collapses during her final dance performance.

Cast 
Adapted from the song book and The Hindu:
 T. R. Mahalingam as "Mittadar" Anandan
 M. R. Radha as Malaiyappan
 Anjali Devi as Kalyani
 E. V. Saroja as Bhairavi
 K. D. Santhanam as Singaram Pillai
 Lakshmi Prabha as Anandan's mother
 A. Karunanidhi as Malaiyappan's sidekick
 S. Rama Rao as Doctor

Production 
Aada Vandha Deivam is an adaption of Ghaleer Ghaleer, a Tamil novel written by LRV. Majestic Studios produced the film adaptation with the backing of Muthukaruppa Reddiar, who owned the studio. Indrani Film presented the film. While the screenplay was written by Era. Shanmugam, the dialogues were written by Viruthai Ramaswami, Murasoli K. Sornam and Guruswami.

Soundtrack 
The music was composed by K. V. Mahadevan. The lyrics were by A. Maruthakasi. Many of the songs became popular, one of which was "Sottu Sottunu Sottuthu Paru".

Release and reception 
Aada Vandha Deivam was released on 1 April 1960, and distributed by Sri Rama Films. The film was positively reviewed by Kanthan of Kalki, and emerged a commercial success.

References

External links 
 

1960 films
1960s romance films
1960s Tamil-language films
Films based on Indian novels
Films directed by P. Neelakantan
Films scored by K. V. Mahadevan
Indian black-and-white films
Indian dance films
Indian romance films